Crurifarcimen is a monotypic genus of millipedes containing the single species Crurifarcimen vagans. Its common name is wandering leg sausage. This millipede is endemic to Tanzania, where it is known only from the Usambara Mountains. It was formally described in 2011 and placed in a newly erected genus of its own. It was declared one of the world's top 10 new species of 2012 by Arizona State University's International Institute for Species Exploration.

Description
This millipede is made up of usually 56 (sometimes 54 to 57) ringlike abdominal segments, each with two pairs of legs, for a total of usually 112 legs. The body is light brown, sometimes darker, and the head, legs, and other parts are brownish yellow. The body segments are smooth, and the male tends to have a shinier body surface than the female.

The millipede lives in rotting wood in mountain forest habitat. Little else is known about the ecology of this species or others of its tribe.

It is, though, the largest millipede known from the Eastern Arc Range, a biodiversity hotspot which includes Tanzania's Usambara Mountains.

Taxonomy
This inspired the simpler common name wandering leg sausage.

Other picks for the IISE Top 10 Species of 2012 list include the sneezing monkey (Rhinopithecus strykeri), the oh boy! jellyfish (Tamoya ohboya), the devil's worm (Halicephalobus mephisto), and the SpongeBob SquarePants mushroom (Spongiforma squarepantsii).

References

Spirobolida
Millipedes of Africa
Endemic fauna of Tanzania
Monotypic arthropod genera